The Taiyang Gold Mine Office is a former office building in Jiufen, Ruifang District, New Taipei, Taiwan.

History
The office building was constructed in 1918 by Yen Brothers 【顏國年 & 顏雲年】 Taiyang Mining Company as the administration and management center of the company. After the decline of the mining industry in the area in 1971, the office building was renovated into an exhibition center. The building was declared a historical building in 2003.

Architecture
The building is divided into several sections, which are the director's office, supervisor's office, engineering department, mining department, mine selection department, warehouse, management department and auditorium.

See also
 List of tourist attractions in Taiwan
 Mining in Taiwan

References

1937 establishments in Taiwan
Buildings and structures in New Taipei
Office buildings in New Taipei
Office buildings completed in 1937